Stidsvig was a locality situated in Klippan Municipality, Skåne County, Sweden with 754 inhabitants in 2010. It lost its independent-locality status in 2015 due to merging with Östra Ljungby.

References 

Populated places in Klippan Municipality
Populated places in Skåne County